Otunga is a surname. Notable people with the surname include:

 David Otunga (born 1980), American wrestler, actor, and lawyer
 Maurice Michael Otunga (1923–2003), Kenyan Roman cardinal and Archbishop of Nairobi

See also
 Obunga

Surnames of Kenyan origin